WDIY (88.1 FM) is a community public radio station licensed to Allentown, Pennsylvania, with studios in Bethlehem and transmitter atop South Mountain.  The station is the NPR member for the Lehigh Valley of eastern Pennsylvania, and also serves parts of western New Jersey.

WDIY has an air staff of over 90 volunteers and a professional staff of six employees, including an executive director. The station is licensed to Lehigh Valley Community Broadcasters Association, Inc., a nonprofit organization whose mission "is to engage the Lehigh Valley community through a wide-ranging exchange of music, arts, news and culturally diverse information."

Background
WDIY began broadcasting on January 8, 1995, operating at 100 watts. Before then, the Lehigh Valley was one of the few areas of Pennsylvania without a locally-based NPR station. WHYY-FM in Philadelphia provides grade B coverage to most of the Lehigh Valley, while WVIA-FM in Scranton has long operated low-powered translators in parts of the region.

Although WDIY's transmitter power was modest for a full NPR member on the FM band, its antenna on top of South Mountain enabled the station to reach most of the immediate Lehigh Valley region. In 2015, the Federal Communications Commission approved a request to triple the station's power to 300 watts. Although still operating with modest power for a full NPR member, the power increase expanded WDIY's primary coverage area to over a half-million people. Its full reach extends 70 miles, providing at least secondary coverage from Clinton, New Jersey to Reading, Pennsylvania.

As a public station, WDIY depends on listener support as one of its major sources of revenue. During the past 10 years, the station's number of listener members has nearly doubled, increasing from 1,100 in 2008 to 2,000 in 2018.

Programming
WDIY's program schedule includes NPR's Morning Edition, Fresh Air with Terry Gross and All Things Considered weekdays, with classical music and adult album alternative music between the news shows.  Early evening programming during the week includes locally-produced public affairs programs as well as NPR's TED Radio Hour and On the Media. Weeknights and weekends, the station features a variety of music, including folk, blues, electronic, jazz, world music, alternative rock, classical, avant-garde and ethnic music. The station also carries NPR's Weekend Edition on Saturday and Sunday mornings and Ask Me Another on Saturday morning.

Translators
WDIY began broadcasting on 88.1 FM at 100 watts. Even with its transmitter located atop South Mountain at 843 feet above average terrain, its signal was for the most part limited to Lehigh and Northampton counties. Easton, the region's third-largest city, only received a grade B signal. To boost its coverage, WDIY installed two translators.  One, located at 93.9, serves the area around Easton, as well as western Warren County.  The station's other translator at 93.7 serves the Trexlertown and Fogelsville areas in western Lehigh County. With its increase to 300 watts in 2015, the station not only covers the Valley but can now be heard in the surrounding regions of eastern Pennsylvania and western New Jersey.

See also
Media in the Lehigh Valley
List of community radio stations in the United States

References

External links
 

 
 

NPR member stations
Community radio stations in the United States
DIY
Radio stations established in 1995